The World Athletics Race Walking Tour (formerly IAAF Race Walking Challenge and World Athletics Challenge - Race Walking) is a racewalking series organised by World Athletics. Athletes accumulate points in specific race walk meetings during the season. Performances in 10 kilometres race walk, 20 kilometres race walk and 50 kilometres race walk count towards athlete's final scores. Since 2011, racewalking performances at the World Athletics Championships and Olympic Games count towards the series. Women have competed in the 50 km distance since 2018.

The series started as a global tour of elite-level, independently-held racewalking meetings. From 2007 to 2012, the series culminated in the IAAF Race Walking Challenge Final. The inclusion of the 2008 IAAF World Race Walking Cup in 2008 marked a move to incorporate international championships into the series. The World Cup returned to the tour in 2010, which was also the first time that the Australian Race Walking Championships was added to the calendar. The 2011 World Championships in Athletics was the first time that performances at a major global athletics championship were included in the series, and this was followed by 2012 Summer Olympics a year later. The series was remodelled in 2013, as the Challenge Final was abolished and instead all the global and continental racewalking competitions were included: the Oceania Race Walking Championships, the Asian Race Walking Championships, the European Race Walking Cup, the African Race Walking Championships, South American Race Walking Championships and the Pan American Race Walking Cup. The 2014 series included the African Championships in Athletics and European Athletics Championships for the first time.

The highest points score achieved in a single series is 48, which was achieved by Norway's Kjersti Plätzer in 2009 and was matched by China's Wang Zhen in 2012. Chinese female walker Liu Hong is the most successful athlete of the series, being the only person to win the series on three occasions. Australian Jared Tallent is the most successful man, with two men's titles and runner-up on two occasions.

Editions

Meetings

The IAAF World Race Walking Team Championships was known as the IAAF World Race Walking Cup until 2016
 † = Meeting hosted IAAF World Cup/Team Championships
 ‡ = Meeting hosted Challenge Final
 †† = Meeting hosted the European Race Walking Cup
 The 2016 and 2017 Chihuahua meeting was held in Ciudad Juárez
 The 2019 series featured three Oceania championship events: the 50 km, the 20 km and the 10,000 m walks

Results

Men

Women

See also
World Athletics Combined Events Tour
IAAF World Cross Challenge

References

External links

Results 1961–2006 at gbrathletics.com
2008 Rules (PDF)

 
Race Walking Challenge
Recurring sporting events established in 2003
Racewalking competitions
Annual athletics series